"AXIS" (also known as "Avengers & X-Men: AXIS") is a 2014 crossover comic book storyline published by Marvel Comics. Written by Rick Remender, the story involves an initial team-up between the Avengers, X-Men, and a group of villains against Red Skull, who managed to harness the powers of Onslaught and the recently deceased Professor Xavier. As the team rapidly begins losing the battle, Scarlet Witch and Doctor Doom cast a powerful inversion spell, which mistakenly reverses the morality of everyone present at the battle, leading to further conflict between the now villainous heroes and heroic villains. Prior to the release of AXIS, tie-ins entitled "March to AXIS" set up the storyline in the September issues of Captain America, Loki: Agent of Asgard, Magneto and Uncanny Avengers. Despite the excitement leading up to the series' release, it received mixed reviews from fans and critics.

Plot

"March to AXIS"

Captain America
Red Skull tells Arnim Zola that everything is in place on his end. Zola is confronted by his daughter Jet, who refuses to return to her father's side. Captain America attacks Zola, while Ian Rogers finds and frees Sharon Carter, only to learn that Zola has a bomb strong enough to destroy all of New York City. Sam removes the telepathic antenna on Zola's body to stop him from controlling the bomb, but this only sets it to activate, so he flies the bomb high into the sky above New York before it goes off.

Loki: Agent of Asgard
After defeating and imprisoning Loki, Doctor Doom discovers his countrymen attacking each other and threatening to overthrow him. Doom begins to feel the effects of the Red Skull's global telepathic assault, realizes the assault is the cause of the Latverian riots, and casts a spell that renders him telepathically immune. Valeria and Verity Willis free Loki, who ultimately stops the Red Skull's telepathic attack.

Magneto
Magneto enters the island of Genosha to find that it had turned into a concentration camp for mutants. He frees two mutant girls who tell him that Red Skull is responsible and possesses Professor X's brain. Magneto attacks Red Skull, but is quickly stopped by the Skull's S-Men. Magneto is captured and telepathically tortured by Red Skull, who gives him visions of those closest to him suffering while being unable to do anything to stop it. After being freed by Scarlet Witch, Rogue, and Havok, he bites down on a vial of Mutant Growth Hormone beneath his skin, giving himself enough power to fight.

Uncanny Avengers
Havok, Rogue, and Scarlet Witch are captured by the Red Skull's S-Men and sent to his concentration camp in Genosha. Rogue (who still has Wonder Man's powers) is able to break the group free. They discover Magneto has been captured, and free him, as well. The three want to leave the island and alert the rest of the Avengers and X-Men of what Red Skull is doing, but Magneto says he's going to stay and fight. Before they can do anything, Red Skull appears. Red Skull now has the group mind-controlled. He plans on using Scarlet Witch's power to shape reality in his image. He tells Magneto to bow if he wants his daughter to remain alive, but Magneto manages to break Red Skull's control over the others. In a fit of rage over finding mutants being used for freak medical experiments, Magneto kills the entire S-Men team and attacks Red Skull, while Skull tells Magneto that Professor X's greatest fear was him leading the X-Men. Magneto kills him, while the others look on in horror. Magneto believes everything is over, only for Red Skull to reappear as a giant called Red Onslaught.

Main plot

Act I – "The Red Supremacy"

Chapter 1: We Will All Be Dead Tomorrow 
While a team of Avengers battle Plantman in Los Angeles, Red Onslaught broadcasts a telepathic wave of hatred across the world, creating countless riots and driving the Avengers to battle each other.  Iron Man manages to deploy a telepathic disrupter and rescues the team, and the Avengers attempt to locate the source of the broadcast. Meanwhile in Genosha, Magneto, Rogue, and the Scarlet Witch fight Red Onslaught, who is still trying to control Wanda to rewrite reality. Magneto frees Havok, Cyclops, Quentin Quire, and Evan Sabahnur, who fight amongst themselves and against Red Skull's hunter Ahab. A team of Avengers and X-Men (Captain America, Hawkeye, Iron Man, Thor, Vision, Colossus, Nightcrawler, Storm) finally arrives shortly to rally the heroes and fight Red Onslaught. Iron Man uses a telepathic dampener to stop the Red Skull's influence, and more heroes arrived to help (Angel, Beast, Cannonball, Doctor Strange, Hulk, Hyperion, Iceman, Invisible Woman, Iron Fist, Luke Cage, Medusa, Nova, Shadowcat, Sunspot) Red Onslaught reveals that he influenced Stark to create a model of Sentinels, based on the knowledge of different super heroes he acquired after the Civil War before erasing the latter's memories of constructing them. Red Onslaught then deploys these Stark Sentinels to fight the heroes.

Chapter 2: Theme to a Desperate Scene 
With the appearance of the Stark Sentinels, the tide of the battle quickly turns to Red Onslaught's favor. Using their opponents' own strengths against them, the Sentinels bathe the heroes in Pym Particles to shrink them to hold them prisoner. Rogue comes up with a plan to defeat the Skull, proposing that Doctor Strange and the Scarlet Witch cast a spell to invert the axis of Red Skull's brain and bring out the fragment of Professor X to defeat Onslaught. The plan fails due to Nova's untimely interference, and Scarlet Witch and Doctor Strange are targeted and captured by the Sentinels.

Magneto flees the battle, and the remaining heroes hide in Genosha with the help of Quentin Quire. After regaining consciousness, Iron Man organizes a last attempt to defeat the Sentinels, but fails and remains the last one standing. Red Onslaught gloats, telling Stark that he had seen into his mind, and that he was a sociopath fueled by competition, but this boast is interrupted by the return of Magneto, accompanied by a group of villains (Absorbing Man, Carnage, Deadpool, Doctor Doom, Enchantress, Hobgoblin, Jack O'Lantern V, Loki, Mystique, and Sabretooth). Due to Stark's emphasis on documenting existing heroes, the Sentinels are not able to properly counter the unfamiliar villainous power sets.

Chapter 3: Good News for Bad People 
The villains manage to defeat one of the Sentinels and free some of the trapped heroes. Scarlet Witch attempts to cast the inversion spell again with the help of Doctor Doom, and this time they are successful in knocking Red Onslaught unconscious and reverting him to the Red Skull. The other Stark Sentinels are defeated shortly thereafter, freeing the remaining heroes. Before Red Skull could wake and reveal whose mind was in control as the X-Men wanted, Steve Rogers and the Avengers decide to be cautious and take him back to Stark Tower. This caused Havok to resign from the Unity Division, telling Steve Rogers that Cyclops was right about him. Havok then sides with the now-unified X-Men and reconciles with his brother.

Act II – "Inversion"

Chapter 1: Altered Beast 
Days later, S.H.I.E.L.D. gathers with Captain America to discuss the fate of Red Skull now that the Stark Sentinels had been dismantled and the concentration camps torn down. Nick Fury tries to convince him to hand Red Skull over, but under the growing influence of the inversion spell, Sam becomes violent and punches Fury, saying that Fury mistaken him for Steve and that "he's not that Captain America".

Meanwhile, in Brooklyn, a family held hostage by the Squid is saved by the now-heroic Carnage. Spider-Man arrives on the scene, thinking that he has to fight Carnage to save the family, but to his surprise he finds the Squid defeated and the family unharmed. Carnage also left a small piece of paper, with a drawing of his face and the phrase "from your friendly neighborhood Carnage," a play on Spider-Man's own catchphrase. Parker finds this both disturbing and verging on copyright violation.

In San Francisco, Iron Man arrives at the San Francisco Giants' stadium where he presented his new digital version of the Extremis, free for every citizen of the city to achieve perfection. Among the crowd is Matt Murdock, who notices that Tony has started drinking again.

At the Jean Grey School, the X-Men reveal their new agenda of no longer desiring co-existence between humans and mutants, but instead desiring to stand above them with the help of Evan Sabahnur, who had become Apocalypse due to the inversion.

Back at the Avengers Tower, Captain America assembles the team regarding the current situation with the X-Men. In response, the Avengers decide to kill Red Skull, even if that might destroy any chance of recovering Professor X's soul. Both Hulk and Edwin Jarvis try to stop them, but they are overwhelmed and left behind. This triggers a new persona to surface in the Hulk called "Kluh," who proceeds to attack the Avengers and flee the Tower, planning to cause destruction. After deciding that Kluh is not their problem as long as he stays out of their way, the Avengers arrive at Red Skull's cell, only to find it empty.

Chapter 2: Something Clearly Went Wrong 
Captain America calls a meeting in the Avengers Tower for all the available heroes who were or had ever been Avengers. After informing the guests about the Red Skull's disappearance, Captain America reveals that only somebody with Avengers clearance would be able to free him, meaning that everyone in the room is a suspect. Spider-Man senses something is wrong, so he quickly escapes through the window along with Nova right before Captain America releases Pym Particles to imprison the gathered heroes. Spider-Man instructs Nova to fly them to safety, but they are attacked by Medusa and Captain America, and saved with the help of Magneto.

Magneto takes Spider-Man and Nova to the Avengers Mansion, where Steve Rogers informs them about the effects of the inversion, including Kluh's rampage across Arizona. Nova leaves to stop him, while the others plan.

At Avengers Tower, Captain America muses over the future of the world to Wasp, who he has hooked up to a machine to extract her Pym Particles. He concludes that the world needs a tyrant, and that he is the best candidate. The X-Men and Apocalypse arrive and attack Avengers Tower, looking for the Red Skull. When they find that he was gone, the X-Men brutally beat Captain America and proclaim their intent to conquer New York, issuing an ultimatum that all humans be evacuated from Manhattan within three hours or perish.

Chapter 3: Awakened Like Us 
After broadcasting a warning for humankind, the X-Men (who had created a gene bomb designed to kill those without the X-Gene in their body) are confronted by Mystique, who attempts to make them see the errors of their ways. Rogue and Nightcrawler stop her and force her to leave with Sabretooth.

Meanwhile, in San Francisco, Daredevil confronts Tony Stark about having unleashed Extremis and the problems this will cause to society. Despite not wearing his normal suit, Tony surprises Matt with increased agility and strength, throwing him from his headquarters.

In Latveria, Doctor Doom is attacked by Scarlet Witch, seeking revenge for Doom's tampering with her mind during the Decimation storyline. Doom is saved by Quicksilver and Magneto, the latter stating that Scarlet Witch would never recover from killing Doom.

In Las Vegas, Loki tried to unsuccessfully make his brother Thor listen to reason, but he has to be saved by Steve Rogers, Nomad, and Spider-Man in the Quinjet. After returning with Loki to the Avengers Mansion, Steve revealed that he has assembled the solution to deal with the inverted Avengers and X-Men: utilizing the team of inverted supervillains that Magneto previously recruited to fight Red Onslaught.

Act III – "New World Disorder"

Chapter 1: End the Line 
As the newly formed Astonishing Avengers storm Apocalypse's ship and fight the X-Men, Spider-Man and the inverted Deadpool (now known as the pacifist hippie "Zenpool") attempt to sneak past Apocalypse and defuse the gene bomb. Zenpool distracts Apocalypse while Spider-Man works, but both fail and are thrown outside the ship, where they join the ongoing battle.

Meanwhile, in Latveria, Scarlet Witch unleashes her power to fight Doom and seemingly kills both Quicksilver and Magneto, also discovering that she actually had no blood ties with Magneto while Doom flees.

In San Francisco, Captain America arrives at Stark Island, where Iron Man introduces him to the inverted Avengers and Medusa, who are willing to join forces once again upon learning that Steve Rogers had assembled the Astonishing Avengers.

Back in Manhattan, Zenpool tries to reason with Apocalypse, but he is beaten and beheaded, and the rest of the Astonishing Avengers are defeated. Apocalypse claims his victory as the gene bomb's countdown almost reaches zero.

Chapter 2: Why They Sting 
With the gene bomb's countdown nearly completed, Spider-Man attempts to stop it by smothering the device with his webbing, but Carnage interrupts, informing him that his efforts will fail. Instead, Carnage sacrifices himself to cover the device with his own symbiote body, and the effort is successful in disabling the bomb. Spider-Man and the Astonishing Avengers now clash with the inverted Avengers, while Loki and Enchantress lure Thor away to another location. During the fight with Scarlet Witch, Doctor Doom is able to revive Brother Voodoo, who uses the spirit of his brother Daniel Drumm to possess Scarlet Witch in an attempt to defeat her. Determined to recover Red Skull from Avengers Tower, Steve Rogers dons a new exoskeleton armor to confront his successor as Captain America, Sam Wilson, demanding that he stand down.

Chapter 3: Grinding Halt 
Using the Red Skull's telepathy, Steve manages to distract Sam long enough to escape. After Captain America's failure to detain Rogers and the Skull, the inverted Avengers set out to the Avengers Mansion after defeated the inverted X-Men. As Apocalypse recovers from defeat, he is confronted by Zenpool's severed head, who convinces him to fight against the evil Avengers.

On the Moon, Loki is chased by Thor, where they come across Mjolnir, which had been left there since Thor became unworthy. Loki finds that he is worthy, picks up the hammer, and starts fighting with the power of Thor.

Back to the Avengers Mansion, Steve Rogers and Red Skull are attacked by the inverted Avengers, but right before Steve is killed by Sam, Apocalypse arrives and stalls for time while Red Skull is taken away. Apocalypse is eventually defeated, and the Avengers manage to catch up. Once again, Spider-Man and Sabretooth stall for time while Steve Rogers tries to get Red Skull to a Quinjet. Iron Man arrives, takes down the aircraft, and is prepared to kill Red Skull when Doctor Doom, Scarlet Witch (possessed by Daniel Drumm), Magneto, Doctor Voodoo, and Quicksilver arrive. Iron Man is incapacitated, and Doom, Daniel Drumm possessing Scarlet Witch, and Red Skull began another inversion spell. It is a success with every person reverted to their original state, except for Iron Man deploying a last-minute telepathic shield that protects himself, Havok, and Sabretooth. After the spell, Havok kidnaps the Wasp as leverage to escape, and Magneto realized that this distraction has also allowed Iron Man, Doctor Doom, and the Red Skull to escape.

Tie-ins

AXIS: Carnage
Having been affected by the inversion, Carnage now feels the need to do good while also controlling his murderous desires. He saves a prostitute from a man, seriously injures him and starting a chain reaction that leads to the woman attacking Carnage, who responds by gently knocking her unconscious and declaring her to be a criminal. However, a crowd gathers saying that he attacked her despite his protests that he was saving her. Meanwhile, a new Sin-Eater is murdering journalists, which unscrupulous reporter Alice Gleason uses to try and boost her popularity. She also points out she wants the superhero beat that an earlier reporter had, now dead, but only if she "gets someone with a cape". Carnage watches her tearful display about the murdered reporters on a TV in a store, thinking that she is a good person and can teach him to be good. When Gleason arrives at her home, Sin-Eater is waiting for her. She tries to offer him fame and fortune but he refuses, but Carnage interrupts singing his own version of Spider-Man's theme song. He then blows off Sin-eater's head and takes away the fainted Alice. Sin-Eater reconstructs his head, a glowing green skull, and watches Carnage swing away. When Alice wakes up, Carnage has webbed her under a bridge and he tells her that she will teach him to be a good hero.

AXIS: Hobgoblin
Following his inversion, Roderick Kingsley returns to New York and finds himself happier with his inversion, although still motivated by greed rather than altruism. He reactivates his franchises where he leases the personas and costumes of deceased or retired superheroes to ordinary people, thus remaining a wanted criminal. He also enfranchises his Hobgoblin persona to various people to perform heroic deeds as Hobgoblin and publishes a comic about them for promotion. Among those who answer are Lily Hollister (who was rendered amnesiac after a botched rescue from the police by Goblin King) and an underemployed teenager named John Myers. He sets a three phase program including a book and various articles with his brand and underground speeches named after Ned Leeds for people to make their own franchises in exchange for a share of their profits, Hobgoblin debuts his Hob-Heroes which consisted of Lily Hollister as Queen Cat, John Myers as Missile Mate, Flower Girl, Leatherboy, Rocket Head, and Water Wizard. When Goblin King confront Roderick Kingsley in his headquarters, Queen Cat came to his defense. Goblin King recognizes Lily Hollister as Queen Cat, but she did not recognize him. Following the attack, Missile Mate is convinced by Urich's claims that the Hobgoblin would soon abandon the heroes he had trained. Missile Mate goes to the Goblin Underground's headquarters and ask Goblin King to join him to be a supervillain. Goblin King is reluctant, but Missile Mate shows him that he had also gathered to join his cause all the supervillains that Hobgoblin had "abandoned" (consisting of 8-Ball III, Killer Shrike II, Melter III, Tiger Shark II, Unicorn IV) after becoming a good guy. When the celebration of a Hobgoblin Day is held with a parade in Roderick Kingsley's honor, Missile Mate betrays Hobgoblin and attempts to murder him in the name of the Goblin King. Roderick had already expected the betrayal and had been using a hologram decoy which took Missile Mate's blow. As soon as Roderick Kinglsey confronts Missile Mate, the Goblin King appears with his Goblin Nation and attacks the celebration. Hobgoblin bests Urich in combat and leaves him to the authorities. After excusing himself from the authorities, Hobgoblin is approached by Steve Rogers to become part of a team of Avengers with the objective to stop the inverted X-Men from detonating a gene bomb which would killed everyone on the Earth who is not a mutant.

Avengers World
Following his inversion, a now altruistic Doctor Doom seeks redemption for his crimes. In order to combat a now-evil Scarlet Witch when she invades Latveria, with the help of Valeria, Doom forms his own team of Avengers consisting of 3D Man, Elsa Bloodstone, Stingray, Valkyrie, and U.S. Agent. It is later revealed that the fight was used by Doom to power a device to put right his previous mistakes; however, forced to choose only one act to repair, he chooses to resurrect the superheroine Stature, whom he had murdered in Avengers: The Children's Crusade.

Deadpool
Magneto manages to recruit Deadpool to help fight Red Onslaught. After the inversion spell was cast, Deadpool had his pacifist personality take control of his mind and body, thus becoming Zenpool.

Magneto
Magneto goes around to recruit some supervillains to help fight Red Onslaught. When Magneto arrived to recruit Hobgoblin, he attacked Magneto and was subjugated and forced to join Magneto's team. He approached Carnage in his self-confinement and convinced Cletus to join him as there would be nothing more chaotic than him saving the world. Magneto destroyed the Doombots which guarding a palace door and enter the castle. There, he finds Doctor Doom, Loki, Verity, and Valeria. He offers an alliance with Doctor Doom and Loki against with the Red Onslaught, which Doom agrees to. Thanks to Loki's help, Magneto was able to get Enchantress to help fight Red Onslaught.

Gathered on the battlefield, Red Onslaught has unleashed chaos on the city: the inversion spell has flipped personalities and psychic attacks are controlling beings for his cause. Magneto, because of his helmet, and select other magical beings are immune. Amidst battle, Magneto has the idea to bring Professor X's conscious to the forefront of Red Onslaught, using Doctor Strange and Scarlet Witch. Doctor Strange is incapacitated, and Doctor Doom steps in. Red Onslaught becomes aware of this and sends Carnage to stop them. While Carnage is attacking Magneto, they successfully cast their spell and the battle ends. Magneto stands away in the distance and the psychic form of Professor X appears. Magneto tries to explain that Professor X was right and that he will meaningfully pursue protecting mutants like Professor X wanted. Professor X reveals that Magneto was right all along and that he was wrong. Magneto walks off to a group of young captured mutants, frees them, and assures their utmost safety. A German officer is seen watching and smiling in the background.

Nova
Kluh was eventually confronted by Nova attempting to bite off Nova's arm before being blasted up the nose. Irritated, Kluh hit Nova so hard he crossed the Atlantic and crashed head-first into the Eiffel Tower. Kluh resumed his rampage.

Aftermath
In the wake of the conflict, New York City is being rebuilt. The press receives a video recorded by the inverted villains before the battle, in which they blamed the recent crisis on themselves as the "Axis of Evil." Steve Rogers recovers from the wounds. Iron Man retreats to Stark Island in San Francisco. Havok returns to the X-Men. Deadpool and Evan Sabahnur have gone into hiding. Thor is still dealing with the ramifications of no longer being worthy. Doctor Doom has abducted the Red Skull and holds him prisoner. The Avengers Unity Division has reformed. Peter Parker builds the rhinestone statue that Carnage requested before his death. Sabretooth is imprisoned, but writes that he promises to follow a better path in life similar to Wolverine now that he is permanently inverted.

Superior Iron Man
Iron Man was present in the Red Onslaught's concentration camp when the Scarlet Witch cast the inversion spell that finally defeated him. The day was saved, but now, he sees things differently. Flying over San Francisco, he delivers a mobile device app that gives the user free access to Extremis 3.0, along with instructions on how to use it to change your body into whatever you want. One week later, Iron Man teams up with She-Hulk on the streets of San Francisco. A kid has been exposed to gamma radiation, gained a monstrous visage and some super-strength, and has started wrecking the street and calling himself "Teen Abomination" (who resembles a teenage version of Abomination). Iron Man starts lecturing the new villain about the importance of branding, but he is met with a blow that takes his head clean off only for Iron Man to reveal that he is controlling the armor remotely. Teen Abomination is stunned by the revelation long enough for Iron Man to incapacitate him with a uni-beam. In the aftermath, She-Hulk lectures Iron Man about using too much force, and vocally disapproves of his callous behavior. From his swimming pool, Tony sends a remote recall signal and the armor returns to the lab. Pepper Potts comes to the pool and tells Tony that she needs to talk to him in private. Tony says he will meet her inside. An hour later, he saunters in rather than immediately. Pepper notices that he has started drinking again. Tony shows her the latest Iron Man suit, which is going to replace the Model 42: the Endo-Sym Armor. A liquid smart-metal design, it utilizes elements of symbiotes and its boot process is fully psionic. Pepper cuts out his spiel about its aesthetic appeal by accusing him of not considering the ramifications of giving everyone with a smartphone access to Extremis. Everyone who had no way of accessing the app is the city's new underclass, while everyone who had access to the app has become part of a wave of orgiastic irresponsibility that has swept the city. On a street corner, a gang of Extremis-enhanced urbanites corner a homeless woman and accuse her of blemishing their perfect future. Before the second punch is thrown though, they are accosted by Daredevil who promises violence if they don't disperse. Suddenly, the leader of the mob keels over in pain. People around the city do the same as Tony explains to Pepper the second part of his strategy to leverage Extremis to provide Stark Industries (as he still calls it) with a large amount of money. Every single Extremis  in San Francisco writhes on the pavement as their biology subtly rewrites itself to default. Every single mobile device in the city pings explaining through a new message that their trial period has expired, and that to continue, they must pay $99.99 per day. Putting on his Endo-Sym Armor, Tony decides to get a good look at the city from the air. That night, Pepper discusses Tony's condition with someone. She says that years ago, Tony said his greatest fear was not that someone would take the contents of his life and use it against him, but rather that something would take his mind, and use him to destroy his life. Pepper believes that this has happened and that she and her co-conspirator need to activate "the contingency." Her ally steps from the shadows revealing that the unnamed person is wearing an early Iron Man suit as he agrees with her.

Titles involved

Collected editions

Reception
IGN gave the story and the overall graphic novel a negative review of 4.5 with the verdict "AXIS stands as one of the great disappointments of 2014. Despite the top-tier creators involved and the pedigree of Uncanny Avengers, this event just didn't come together. Only sporadic moments of fun crop up during the barrage of rushed art and poor characterization. And while the overall pacing does benefit slightly in this collected format, the hardcover's lack of extras and poor paper quality make the high cover price a hard pill to swallow."

References

Marvel Comics storylines
2014 comics debuts
2014 comics endings
2014 in comics
Superhero comics